Mihkel Hellman (also Mihkel Hellermaa; 28 October 1891 Märjamaa Parish, Lääne County – 28 April 1942 Soviet Union) was an Estonian politician. He was a member of III Riigikogu. He was a member of the Riigikogu since 1 October 1928. He replaced Benedikt Oskar Oja.

References

1891 births
1942 deaths
Members of the Riigikogu, 1926–1929